Bamyan or Bamyan Valley; also spelled Bamiyan or Bamian is the capital of Bamyan Province in central Afghanistan. Its population of approximately 70,000 people makes it the largest city in Hazarajat. The Bamyan Airport is located in the middle of the city. The Band-e-Amir National Park is to the west, about a half-hour drive from the city of Bamyan.

Bamyan is referred to by some as the "Shining Light" and "Valley of Gods". There are several tourist attractions near the city, including the Buddhas of Bamyan, which were carved into cliffs on the north side of Bamyan city in the 6th and 7th century CE, dating them to the Hephthalite rule. Other attractions close to the city include Shahr-e Gholghola and Zuhak. In 2008, Bamyan was found to be the home of the world's oldest oil paintings. At the end of the 10th century, there was a Buddhist culture in which several thousand Buddhist monks lived in caves carved into the mountain. The 53 meters known as the Salsal and 35 meters known as Shahmama are the high-standing Buddha statues and best-known monuments left by the Buddhists, which were destroyed by the Taliban in 2001. Furthermore, there are several cultural sites left from both the Buddhist and the later Islamic era of the valley. After the overthrown of the Taliban from power in 2002, considerable efforts had been made to preserve the cultural monuments in the valley. The city of Bamyan has four districts and a total land area of 3,539 hectares. The total number of dwellings in this city is 4,435.

The Bamyan valley marked the most westerly point of Buddhist expansion and was a crucial hub of trade for much of the second millennium CE. It was a place where East met West and its archaeology reveals a blend of Greek, Turkic, Persian, Chinese, and Indian influences. The valley is one of Afghanistan's most touristic places.

The city of Bamyan joined the UNESCO Creative Cities Network as a Crafts and Folk Art city in 2017. "UNESCO noted the Bamiyan Valley is the most monumental expression of western Buddhism". Bamiyan is now listed by UNESCO as a World Heritage Site in Danger.

On 15 August 2021, Bamyan was seized again by Taliban fighters, becoming the twenty-ninth provincial capital to be captured by the Taliban as part of the wider 2021 Taliban offensive.

Name 
The name "Bamiyan" is derived from Middle Persian Bamikan.

Geography 

The 2,500 m high valley is about 230 km northwest of Kabul and separates the Hindu Kush mountain range from the Koh-e Baba mountains. On the north side, there is an approximately 1.5 kilometers long, high, almost vertical sandstone cliff that was formed by a glacier. The Buddha statues and most of the caves in the valley were carved into this rock face. In the valley itself and on the slopes, there are numerous ruins from earlier times.

"Bamiyan is located between the Indian subcontinent (to the southeast) and Central Asia (to the north), which made it an important location close to one of the most important branches of the Silk Route". Situated on the ancient Silk Route, the town was at the crossroads between the East and West when all trade between China and the Middle East passed through it. The Hunas made it their capital in the 5th century. Because of the cliff of the Buddhas, the ruins of the Monk's caves, Shahr-e Gholghola ('City of Sighs', the ruins of an ancient city destroyed by Genghis Khan during the 1221 siege of Bamiyan), and its local scenery, it is one of the most visited places in Afghanistan. The Shahr-e Zuhak mound ten miles south of the valley is the site of a citadel that guarded the city, and the ruins of an acropolis could be found there as recently as the 1990s.

The town is the cultural center of the Hazara ethnic group of Afghanistan. Most of the population lives in downtown Bamyan. The valley is cradled between the parallel mountain ranges of the Hindu Kush and the Koh-i-Baba.

Mountains cover ninety percent of the province, and the cold, long winter, lasting for six months, brings temperatures of three to twenty degrees Celsius below zero. Mainly Daizangi Hazara people live in the area. Transportation facilities are increasing, but sparse. Notably, Bamyan is now connected by road to Kabul through Parwan province and Maidan Wardak. The connection between Maidan Shar and Bamyan – 136 km long – makes it possible to reach Kabul in a 2-hour drive. The connection is almost completed missing just 15 km of paving. 
 
The main crops are wheat, barley, mushung, and baquli, grown in spring. When crops are damaged by unusually harsh weather, residents herd their livestock down to Ghazni and Maidan provinces to exchange for food.

Climate 
Bamyan has a cold desert climate (Köppen BWk), with cold winters and warm, dry summers. Precipitation mostly falls in late winter and spring.

History 

The city of Bamyan was part of the Kushan Empire in the early centuries of the Christian era. After the Kushan Empire fell to the Sassanids, Bamyan became part of the Kushansha, vassals to the Sassanids. The Buddhist pilgrim Fa Xian visited Bamyan in the fifth century and recorded that the king summoned the monks of the region for vows and prayers. Fa Xian also records landslides and avalanches in the mountains and the presence of snow during winter and summer. This latter statement suggests climatic change which could have contributed to the historical and economic importance of the area for the years to come. Another Buddhist traveller, Xuanzang, passed through Bamyan in the seventh century. His record shows that the Bamiyan Buddhas and cave monastery near it were already built. He also records that Buddhism in the region was in decay with the people being "hard and uncultivated".

The Hephthalites conquered Bamyan in the 5th century. After their Khanate was destroyed by the Sassanids and Turks in 565, Bamyan became the capital of the small Kushano-Hephthalite kingdom until 870, when it was conquered by the Saffarids. Favoured by its location on one of the main trade routes from the West to China and India, the valley was of great strategic importance. It became a stop for trade caravans, a well-known artistic site and was also a major Buddhist center for centuries. It later fell to the Ghaznavids in the 11th century. Bamiyan was Islamized under the reign of Sultan Mahmud. This was around the time of the first millennium AD. At that time, the center of the city of Bamiyan was moved from the northwest of the valley, where the cliff with the Buddha statues is located, further to the southeast. Some of the fortifications in the valley also date from this period. During the Ghurids rule, Bamiyan was the capital of a large kingdom for about 60 years, namely from 1155 to 1212, which stretched north to the Oxus River (today's Amu Darya). In 1221 the city and its population were said to be completely wiped out by Genghis Khan. It is claimed that he was taking revenge for his slain grandson. Bamiyan was unable to recover from this event for a long time. Even decades later, the city was still devastated, according to a report by a Persian historian. Several decades passed before a town appeared in the valley again, but it could only acquire regional importance. The Qarlughids established their capital in the city soon thereafter. There is some evidence that Bamyan was somewhat populated and reconstructed during the Timurid period in the 15th century.

From the age of the Timurids, there is said to have been a city again in Bamiyan. However, the general decline in coast-to-coast trade during this time meant that the city could no longer grow to its old size and could no longer achieve supra-regional importance.

Bamiyan is also mentioned again in the history books during the Mughal Empire , especially in connection with Aurangzeb , who had the 53 m tall Buddha statue shot at with cannons during his looting.

During the time of the Afghan monarchy, Bamiyan was a bulwark in the central mountain region. At that time, however, the area was still claimed by the Uzbek Miren ruling in the north. They demanded tribute payments, mainly in the form of deliveries from slaves from the Hazara tribes of the surrounding mountains.

In 1840, the region was under conflict because of the First Anglo-Afghan War when the British routed Dost Mohammad Khan and his forces. The first European to see Bamyan was William Moorcroft (explorer) about 1824.
During 1998–2001, Bamyan has been the center of combat between Taliban forces and the anti-Taliban alliance; mainly Hizb-i-Wahdat – amid clashes among the warlords of the local militia. Bamyan is also known as the capital of Daizangi.

Buddhas of Bamiyan 

Ashoka, the ruler of the ancient Indian Maurya dynasty, according to an old inscription, was sent in 261 BC. to convert the area. This was just before the Greco-Bactrian Kingdom declared independence in the northern Hindu Kush region.

Under the rule of the Kushana dynasty, Buddhism gradually established itself in the Hindu Kush area. Between the 2nd and 4th centuries AD, a number of Buddhist sites arose along the trade routes at that.  Bamiyan itself was to become the largest and most famous of these Buddhist sites. However, the exact point in time when Buddhism found its way into Bamiyan itself is not known.

This Buddhist art was significantly influenced by the earlier Gandhara culture, which was developed further in the south, and the Indian Gupta culture was the result of this cultural creation being unique of its kind. The Gandhara culture was already in retreat or largely collapsed when Buddhism experienced a revival here.

The two large Buddha statues were constructed on the large rock facing the north side of the valley in the 6th century. Corridors and galleries were carved into the rock around the figures and hundreds of prayer halls and caves were created, some of which were decorated with rich wall paintings.

The number of caves currently present in Bamiyan is estimated to be around 1,000. The time of origin is dated to the period from 450 to 850 AD. Some of the murals have been identified as the oldest known oil paintings in the world, dating to the 7th century. An earlier chronicle estimates the number at 12,000 caves, a number that is exaggerated for the Bamiyan Valley alone, but seems appropriate for the entire region, including around 50 km of surrounding valleys. The oil painting of Bamyan Buddha is related to the 5th to 9th century and those paintings were made of oil, hundreds of years before the technique was "invented" in Europe. The scientists discovered that 12 out of the 50 caves were painted with oil painting technique, using perhaps walnut and poppy seed drying oils.

In late ancient times, the adjoining room was mainly in the hands of tribes who were counted among the Iranian Huns and were in conflict with the Sassanid Empire. After 560, the Gök Turks became the dominant power in Transoxania.

Xuanzang, a Chinese monk, visited the valley around 630 AD and was welcomed by King Bamiyan. He spent around 15 days in the valley and described the Buddha statues present in the valley, as well as the location of some temples, whereby his information was confirmed by science as very exact. Based on further statements by Xuanzang, it is assumed that at least half of the one thousand caves known today must have been inhabited. Almost a hundred years later, in 727, the Korean monk Hyecho (Hui Chao) described Bamiyan as an independent and powerful kingdom, despite the presence of Muslim-Arab troops in the north and south of the region.

On the cliff face of a mountain nearby, three colossal statues were carved 4,000 feet apart. One of them was 175 feet (53 m) high standing statue of Buddha, the world's tallest. The ancient statue was carved during the Kushan period in the fifth century. The statues were destroyed by the Taliban in March 2001, on the grounds that they were an affront to Islam. Limited efforts have been made to rebuild them, with negligible success. Destroying two giant Buddhas in Bamyan was one of the spectacular and worst attacks against the cultural art and history of Afghanistan on February 26, 2001. All news had reports about it around the world. It is all about history's distorting by the commandant of extremist terrorist clerics of the Taliban.

At one time, two thousand monks meditated in caves among the sandstone cliffs. The caves were also a big tourist attraction before the long series of wars in Afghanistan. The world's earliest oil paintings have been discovered in caves behind the destroyed statues. Scientists from the European Synchrotron Radiation Facility have confirmed that the oil paintings, probably of either walnut or poppy seed oil, are present in 12 of the 50 caves dating from the 5th to 9th century. The murals typically have a white base layer of a lead compound, followed by an upper layer of natural or artificial pigments mixed with either resins or walnut or poppy seed drying oils.  Possibly, the paintings may be the work of artists who traveled on the Silk Road.

The caves at the base of these statues were used by the Taliban for storing weapons. After the Taliban were driven from the region, civilians made their homes in the caves. Recently, Afghan refugees escaped the persecution of the Taliban regime by hiding in caves in the Bamiyan valley. These refugees discovered a fantastic collection of Buddhist statues as well as jars holding more than ten thousand fragments of ancient Buddhist manuscripts, a large part of which is now in the Schøyen Collection. This has created a sensation among scholars, and the find has been compared with the discovery of the Dead Sea Scrolls.

From 2003 to 2013, a Provincial Reconstruction Team was based in Bamyan, first manned by U.S. forces, and, since April 2003, by New Zealand Defence Force personnel which made up the Provincial Reconstruction Team. The 34th Division in the area, part of the 4th Corps, was affiliated with Karim Khalili. Bamiyan was one of the first pilot centers for the Afghan New Beginnings Programme of Disarmament, demobilization and reintegration. On 4 July 2004 disarmament began in Bamiyan, and on 15 July 2004 disarmament was continued in Bamiyan including soldiers from the 34th and 35th Divisions of the then Afghan Army, often referred to as the Afghan Military or Militia Forces.

Demography

As of 2014, the population of the city of Bamyan is approximately 70,000.

Bamyan's festivals and bazaars

Potato flower festival 
The potato Flower Festival is a famous festival in Bamyan as Agricultural for people which is organized by farmers and government organization and promote local Product. The Potato Flower Festival ( Gol-e- Kachalo in Dari) which celebrated for the first time in 2017 and people make many different foods from only potatoes and music is also part of the Festival. More than 80 percent of the population in Bamyan depends on agriculture products and potato is their main product. Furthermore, Bamyan produces 60 percent of the potatoes in Afghanistan.

Dambura musical festival 
Dambura is one of the Famous traditional music equipment which is guitar-like is made from mulberry wood, which is popular and largely used by classic singers and folklore, musicians mainly played in central. traditional Dambura festival is held each year in a bid to help improve the tourism industry of Bamyan province.

Bamyan art bazaar 
Bamyan Art Bazaar which made by Afghan women in Bamyan where they display and sell their handicrafts to internal and foreign tourists who visit the province. Carpets, rugs, felts, embroidery, pottery and other local women's products can be mostly found in the art market shops. All the sellers are women and the products they sell are either their own or bought from women providing at homes. The city of Bamiyan is the only urban settlement in the entire Bamiyan Province. It became the center of the then-newly created Bamiyan Province in 1964. The city grew rapidly, but at the same time suffered from the lack of a zoning plan. Bamiyan's bazaar at that time had around 300 to 400 shops and its market was very busy twice a week.

Natural beauty of Bamyan 

Afghanistan established its first national park on April 22, 2009, to promote and protect the natural beauty of a series of intensely blue lakes created by natural dams high in the Hindu Kush. Band-e-Amir is a chain of six lakes in the mountainous desert of central Afghanistan. The lakes formed from mineral-rich water that seeped out of faults and cracks in the rocky landscape. Over time, the water deposited layers of hardened mineral (travertine) that built up into walls that now contain the water. According to the Wildlife Conservation Society, which helped the Afghan government set up the park, Band-e-Amir is one of the few travertine systems in the world. Bamyan Despite being one of the country's poorest and least developed regions, Bamiyan remains one of the safest areas of Afghanistan today. For those who helped create the national park in 2009 after decades of delay due to war, the peaceful Band-e-Amir National Park tells an entirely different story of a country whose recent historical narrative has been defined by violence. Band-e-Amir National Park is located in central Afghanistan's Bamiyan province, .The WCS, along with a number of international agencies and funding partners including USAID and the United Nations Development Programme, assisted the local Afghan government in helping to establish and manage the park. in Band-e-Amir the deep blue color of the lakes is due to the clarity of the air as well as the purity of the water. The high mineral content of the lakes also causes the intense and varying colors of the lake waters. In addition, Band-e- Amir made from six lakes; Of the six lakes, Band-e Panir is the smallest, with a diameter of approximately 100 m (330 ft). The largest is Band-e Zulfiqar, which measures some 6.5 km (4 mi) in length. The most accessible of the lakes is Band-e-Haibat, literally translated as Dam of Awe.

Historical sites 

The numerous remains of monasteries, painted caves, statues and fortifications have been on the UNESCO list of world cultural heritage since 2003. At the same time, they were also entered on the Red List of World Heritage in Danger.

The protected world heritage sites include in detail:

The famous Bamiyan Buddha statues from the 6th century. Around the niches of the two 53 and 35 meter high, destroyed statues, at least 900 caves are carved into the rock, decorated with frescoes and stucco work.
The Islamic fortress Schahr-i Suhak about 15 km east of the cliff from the time of the Ghaznavids and the Ghurids (10th to 13th centuries).
The remains of Qallai Kaphari about 12 km east of the cliff with protective walls, towers, and castles.
The fortified castle Schahr-e Gholghola on a hill in the middle of the valley (6th to 10th centuries).
The Kakrak valley about 3 km southeast of the cliff contains over 100 caves from the 6th to 13th centuries, the remains of a 10 meter high Buddha statue and an altar with paintings from the Sassanid Empire.
The caves in the Foladi Valley about 2 km southwest of the cliff, especially the ornate Qoul-i Akram and Kalai Ghamai caves.

Sports in Bamyan 

"Ski championships" have been held in Bamiyan since 2011. It is a one-time race with a mass start. The first skiers were equipped with modern equipment in 2011. However, locals also used "replicas" of skis to move around in the mountains, for example in search of runaway pets.

On November 4, 2016, a marathon took place in Bamiyan, in which women athletes participated for the first time.

International sister cities 
  Gering, Nebraska, U.S.
 Langley, British Columbia, Canada
  Porirua, New Zealand

See also 
 List of cities in Afghanistan

Notes

References

External links 

 Bamyan Tourism – Official Website
 Preparations for the great skiing competition in Bamiyan (video Feb. 26, 2019)
 Bamyan's interesting hotels in the Bamyan TV special report (video Nov. 22, 2018)

Populated places in Bamyan Province
Populated places along the Silk Road
Buddhism in Afghanistan
Hazarajat
Hazara people
Provincial capitals in Afghanistan
Cities in Afghanistan